Museo del Ferrocarril meaning  Railway Museum may refer to:

Railway Museum (Madrid), Spain (Museo del Ferrocarril)
Catalonia Railway Museum, Spain (Museu del Ferrocarril de Catalunya)
Gijón Railway Museum, Spain (Museo del Ferrocarril de Asturias)
Guatemala City Railway Museum, Guatemala (Museo del Ferrocarril FEGUA)

See also
List of railway museums